Carter is an unincorporated community in Carter County, Kentucky, United States. Carter has a post office with ZIP code 41128.

References

Unincorporated communities in Carter County, Kentucky
Unincorporated communities in Kentucky